Gyuri is a given name used in both Hungarian and Korean culture.

Hungarian name
As a Hungarian name, Gyuri (pronounced , starting with a voiced palatal stop) is a masculine name. It is a diminutive of György. People with this name include:
Gyuri Sarossy (born 1974), British actor of Hungarian descent.
Ioan Gyuri Pascu (born 1961), Romanian pop singer of Hungarian descent

Korean name

As a Korean given name, Gyuri (pronounced ) is a feminine name. It may also be spelled Gyu-ri or Kyu-ri. Its meaning differs based on the hanja used to write each syllable of the name. There are 20 hanja with the reading "kyu" and 26 hanja with the reading "ri" on the South Korean government's official list of hanja which may be registered for use in given names.

Korean people with this name include:
Kim Gyu-ri (actress, born June 1979), South Korean actress
Kim Gyu-ri (actress, born August 1979), South Korean actress
Nam Gyu-ri (born 1985), South Korean singer, member of trio SeeYa
Park Gyu-ri (born 1988), South Korean singer, member of Kara
Jang Gyu-ri (born 1997) South Korean singer, member of Fromis 9

See also
 List of Korean given names

References

Hungarian masculine given names
Korean feminine given names